The Ultra 30 (code-named Quark) is a family of Sun Microsystems workstations based on the UltraSPARC II microprocessor. It was the first Sun workstation to use the industry-standard PCI bus instead of Sun's proprietary SBus, and is a member of the Sun Ultra series. It launched in July 1997 and shipped with Solaris 2.6. The Ultra 30 reached its end-of-life in May 1999.

The Ultra 30 ran off of a single UltraSPARC II CPU; however, it was only compatible with two models: the 250 MHz module (501-4857) and the 300 MHz module (501-4849). The system supports two Ultra SCSI hard drives and 16 DIMM slots for a maximum of 2 GB memory capacity. The machine also featured four full-sized PCI slots, two UPA slots, two RS-232C/RS-423 serial ports, and 100BASE-T Fast Ethernet.

Compatible Sun Part Numbers

References

External links
Ultra 30 Workstation Handbook
Ultra 30 Workstation Documentation
Ultra 30 Reference Manual
Ultra 30 Installation Guide

Sun workstations
SPARC microprocessor products